Old Friends, New Friends is an album by guitarist Ralph Towner recorded in 1979 and released on the ECM label.

Reception 
The Allmusic review by Scott Yanow awarded the album 4 stars calling it "An intriguing set well worth several listens".

Track listing
All compositions by Ralph Towner
 "New Moon" - 7:27   
 "Yesterday and Long Ago" - 7:51   
 "Celeste" - 4:54   
 "Special Delivery" - 7:04   
 "Kupala" - 8:05   
 "Beneath an Evening Sky" - 7:00
Recorded at Talent Studios in Oslo, Norway in  July 1979

Personnel 
 Ralph Towner — twelve-string guitar, classical guitar, piano, French horn
 Kenny Wheeler — trumpet, flugelhorn
 David Darling — cello
 Eddie Gómez — bass
 Michael Di Pasqua — drums, percussion

References 

ECM Records albums
Ralph Towner albums
1979 albums
Albums produced by Manfred Eicher